The Planet Eclipse Ego is an Electropneumatic paintball marker, Open bolt stack tube Paintball marker manufactured by Planet Eclipse. The Ego was first introduced in late 2004 (as the 2005 model).

Variations

Stock models
Starting with the EGO 05 the internals ran at 95psi LPR (Low-Pressure Regulator) and 180 on the HPR.

EGO 05 (Late 2004) - Planet Eclipse's first complete paintball marker, the 2005 model released in 2004.
EGO 06 (2006) 
EGO 7 (2007)
EGO 8 (2008)
EGO 9 (2009)
EGO Ten (2010)
EGO 11 (2011)
EGO LV1 (2013)
EGO LV1.1 (2015)
EGO LV1.5 (2017)
EGO LV1.6 (2020)
EGO LV2 (2022)

ETek
Planet Eclipse released the ETek as a budget version of the Ego. The ETek shares some of the same features as the Ego but lacks some of the high-end features like the LCD or OLED screen. The Ego also uses a better manufacturing process leaving it with a more high-end or premium feel. 

ETek 
ETek2 - Announced in November 2007 and made available soon thereafter, the ETek2 is the second generation ETek. Improvements over the original ETek include a lighter weight, new circuit board, redesigned trigger frame, new on/off air system, new inline regulator, new low-pressure regulator, and standard 2-piece Shaft barrel. Some have commented that these upgrades make the ETek2 effectively an SL66.
ETek3 (2008)
ETek4 AM (2012)
ETek4 LT (2012)
ETek5 (December 2014)

Special editions

Planet Eclipse has a long tradition of making custom paintball markers, and they have made many special edition Egos. Some editions include custom milling such as the SL8R. Other editions include special coloring or printing on the body, like many of the professional team versions of the Ego. Below is a list of some special edition Egos, mainly the markers with special milling.

SL66
SL74
SL8R
SL94
SL91
SLS
CSL
Vicious

References

External links
Planet Eclipse Web Pagegames extreme 

Paintball markers